John Fusco is an American Republican Party politician currently serving as a member of the Connecticut House of Representatives from the 81st district, which includes part of the town of Southington, since 2017. Fusco was first elected in 2016 and currently serves as a member of the Banking, Aging, and Commerce Committees.

References

Living people
Republican Party members of the Connecticut House of Representatives
People from Southington, Connecticut
Year of birth missing (living people)